Jumeok-bap, sometimes jumeokbap, is a Korean rice dish made from a lump of cooked rice made into a round loaf the shape of a fist. Rice balls are a common item in dosirak (a packed meal) and often eaten as a light meal, between-meal snack, street food, or an accompaniment to spicy food. The commercialization of Jumeok-bap began in earnest in 1990, when Japanese cuisine gradually spread to Korea and onigiri were popularized. Although it did not receive special attention in the early years, it gained popularity as an inexpensive, easy-to-prepare food during the 1997 Asian financial crisis.  In the 2010s, a variety of forms of Jumeok-bap were released, including a round-shaped onigiri and a rice burger in the shape of a hamburger.

References 

Korean words and phrases
Glutinous rice dishes
Korean rice dishes
Street food in South Korea